The Johann Heinrich Voß Prize in Translation is awarded yearly by the German Academy for Language and Poetry in Darmstadt.

Established 1958, it was named after the German poet and philologist Johann Heinrich Voß.

Award-winners

 1958: Edwin Muir and Willa Muir
 1959: Benno Geiger
 1960: E. K. Rahsin (Elisabeth „Less“ Kaerrick)
 1961: Jakob Hegner
 1962: Rudolf Alexander Schröder
 1963: Friedhelm Kemp
 1964: Michael Hamburger
 1965: Wolfgang Schadewaldt
 1966: Eva Rechel-Mertens, Philippe Jaccottet
 1967: Witold Wirpsza, Karl Dedecius
 1968: Eva Hesse
 1969: Hans Hennecke
 1970: Janheinz Jahn
 1971: Karl August Horst
 1972: Elmar Tophoven
 1973: Peter Gan (Richard Moering)
 1974: Peter Urban
 1975: Curt Meyer-Clason
 1976: Hanns Grössel
 1977: Edwin Maria Landau
 1978: Übersetzerkollegium der Deutschen Thomas von Aquin-Ausgabe
 1979: Gerda Scheffel and Helmut Scheffel
 1980: Annemarie Schimmel
 1981: Wolfgang Kasack
 1982: Heinz von Sauter
 1983: Rolf-Dietrich Keil
 1984: Anneliese Botond
 1985: Elisabeth Schnack
 1986: Hanno Helbling
 1987: Rudolf Wittkopf
 1988: Traugott König
 1989: Michael Walter
 1990: Manfred Fuhrmann
 1991: Fritz Vogelgsang
 1992: Simon Werle
 1993: Roswitha Matwin-Buschmann
 1994: Werner von Koppenfels
 1995: Rosemarie Tietze
 1996: Joachim Kalka
 1997: Hans-Horst Henschen
 1998: Gustav Just
 1999: Harry Rowohlt
 2000: Armin Eidherr
 2001: Burkhart Kroeber
 2002: Gisela Perlet
 2003: Hans Wolf
 2004: Michael von Albrecht
 2005: Elisabeth Edl
 2006: Ralph Dutli
 2007: Stefan Weidner
 2008: Verena Reichel
 2009: Susanne Lange
 2010: Zsuzsanna Gahse
 2011: Frank Günther
 2012: Gabriele Leupold
 2013: Wolfgang Kubin
 2014: Sabine Stöhr
 2015: Anne Birkenhauer
 2016: Anne Weber
 2017: Renate Schmidgall
 2018: Wolfgang Schlüter
 2019: 
 2020: Ernest Wichner
 2021: Barbara Kleiner
 2022: Rainer G. Schmidt

References

External links
 

Translation awards
Awards established in 1958
1958 establishments in Germany